Gray Horse was a professional football player who played in the National Football League during the 1923 season. That season, he joined the NFL's Oorang Indians. The Indians were a team based in LaRue, Ohio, composed only of Native Americans, and coached by Jim Thorpe. Gray Horse was a Chippewa.

On November 4, 1923 against the Chicago Bears, Gray Horse fumbled the football which was picked up by the Bears' George Halas and ran back for a 98-yard touchdown. This set the record for the longest touchdown run with a fumble.

References

Uniform Numbers of the NFL
Tales of Lac du Flambeau

Notes

20th-century Native Americans
Native American players of American football
Players of American football from Minnesota
Oorang Indians players
Year of birth missing
Place of birth missing